Pietrosul may refer to the following rivers in Romania:

 Pietrosul, a tributary of the Mureș in Harghita County
 Pietrosul, a tributary of the Siret in Iași County
 Pietrosul, a tributary of the Sulța in Bacău County
 Pietrosul, a tributary of the Tazlăul Sărat in Bacău County

See also
 Pietrosu (disambiguation)
 Pârâul Pietros (disambiguation)